Burkholderia anthina is a species of bacteria of the family Burkholderiaceae.

References

External links
 Burkholderia J.P. Euzéby: List of Prokaryotic names with Standing in Nomenclature

Type strain of Burkholderia anthina at BacDive -  the Bacterial Diversity Metadatabase

Burkholderiaceae
Bacteria described in 2002